Francis Coleman (12 January 192410 April 2008) was a conductor and television producer and director.

Early life and education
Born in Montreal, Quebec, Canada, Coleman began working in an office at the age of fourteen while studying music at evening classes. He continued his musical education at McGill University, the Conservatoire de musique et d'art dramatique du Québec and then the Eastman School of Music in Rochester, New York, before conducting under Pierre Monteux.

Career

In Canada
Coleman conducted a range of ensembles, including the Royal Canadian Air Force band, and was appointed the first musical director of the Royal Winnipeg Ballet. This led him to become the editor of Dance Magazine. He also conducted concerts broadcast for CBC Radio, and it was this which attracted him to work on CBFT, the first television station in Canada, when it launched in September 1952. He initially worked on the bilingual news programme, and had produced more than 500 shows by 1958, including coverage of Elizabeth II of the United Kingdom's coronation.

In the UK
Coleman was invited to work at Granada Television in England by Sidney Bernstein. He produced a variety of programmes, including Spot the Tune, Shadow Squad and Chelsea at Nine. He soon moved to London where he worked for ATV, for whom he directed twenty-six schools programmes entitled Içi la France.  This led on to other French language documentary work, for which he was created a Chevalier of the Ordre des Arts et des Lettres. Also for ATV, he produced John Betjeman's Steam and Stained Glass; the UK's first hidden camera show, Bob Boothby's Dinner Party; and the country's first consumer programme, On The Braden Beat.

In 1964, Coleman was appointed Senior Producer, Music and Arts at the newly launched BBC 2.  He produced a wide range of specials and series, including Shakespeare and Music, Solti on Conducting and Peter Ustinov on Peter Ustinov. He recorded II Trovatore in Rome which was shown as live, an original idea at the time, and later applied the same treatment to Monteverdi's Vespers from Venice.

Coleman moved to become Head of Religious, Children's and Education Programmes at London Weekend Television in 1968, during which time he won the first Japan Prize for education. Next, he went to Thames Television, first as Head of Schools Programmes, then Head of Arts. He produced the Saint Nicholas Cantata by Benjamin Britten, for which he won the UK's first Prix Italia.

Other activities and retirement
In his spare time, Coleman wrote the Bluffers Guides to ballet and opera, was a community activist in Highgate and Muswell Hill and was a Buddhist who appeared on BBC Radio 4's Thought for the Day.

After retiring from television, Coleman led a campaign to save the Phoenix Cinema in East Finchley, and following its success, ran it for a time.  He then moved into lecturing, both at the London International Film School and at City University.

Personal life
Coleman's two daughters both became actors: Charlotte (who died in 2001) and Lisa.

References

1924 births
2008 deaths
Chevaliers of the Ordre des Arts et des Lettres
McGill University School of Music alumni
Eastman School of Music alumni
Academics of City, University of London
English Buddhists
Canadian Buddhists
Male conductors (music)
Canadian magazine editors
Music directors
British television directors
Canadian television directors
British television executives
British television producers
Canadian television producers
Musicians from Montreal
Canadian emigrants to England
British people of American descent
Canadian people of American descent
20th-century Canadian conductors (music)
20th-century Canadian male musicians